Torsten Schmidt (born 18 February 1972) is a former German cyclist.

Career achievements

Major results

1992
1st stage 1 Tour DuPont
1st stage 5 Olympia's Tour
1st stage 1 Tour de Wallonie
1993
2nd Tour de Berlin
1998
1st Grand Prix Théo Mulheims
1st Tour of Normandie
1st stage 1
1st Rund um Düren
1st stage 6 Niedersachsen-Rundfahrt
1st stage 6b Rheinland-Pfalz Rundfahrt
2nd Tour de Berlin
3rd Grand Prix de la Ville de Lillers
1999
1st Route Adélie
1st Niedersachsen-Rundfahrt
1st stage 4b
1st stage 10 Vuelta a Argentina
1st stage 4 3-Länder-Tour
3rd Colliers Classic
3rd Bayern Rundfahrt
2000
1st Niedersachsen-Rundfahrt
1st stage 6
1st Grand Prix EnBW (with Michael Rich)
2001
1st stage 2 3-Länder-Tour
1st stage 4 Rheinland-Pfalz Rundfahrt
2nd Niedersachsen-Rundfahrt
3rd Rund um Köln
2002
2nd 3-Länder-Tour
2004
1st stage 4 Rheinland-Pfalz Rundfahrt
2005
1st Eindhoven Team Time Trial
2006
1st stage 8 Peace Race

Grand Tour general classification results timeline

References

1972 births
Living people
German male cyclists
People from Schwelm
Sportspeople from Arnsberg (region)
Directeur sportifs
German cycling coaches
Cyclists from North Rhine-Westphalia